Herman Mignon (born 21 March 1951) is a Belgian middle-distance runner. He competed in the men's 800 metres at the 1972 Summer Olympics.

References

1951 births
Living people
Athletes (track and field) at the 1972 Summer Olympics
Athletes (track and field) at the 1976 Summer Olympics
Belgian male middle-distance runners
Olympic athletes of Belgium
Place of birth missing (living people)